”Cnephasia” chlorocrossa is a species of moth of the family Tortricidae. It is found in South Africa (Western Cape).

References

Endemic moths of South Africa
Moths described in 1926
Cnephasiini